Raja Mahendra Aridaman Singh is an Indian politician and a member of the Sixteenth Legislative Assembly of Uttar Pradesh in India. He represents the Bah constituency of Uttar Pradesh and was a member of the Samajwadi Party political party until 15 January 2017 when he joined the rival Bharatiya Janata Party.

Early life and  education
Singh was born in Royal Rajput family of Agra district. His father Mahendra Ripudaman Singh was also an MLA for four terms from Bah. He attended the St. John's College, Agra, and attained a Master of Commerce degree.

Political career
Singh has been a MLA for six terms. He represented the Bah constituency and was a member of the Samajwadi Party political party. On 15 January 2017, Singh joined the Bharatiya Janata Party along with his wife.

Posts held

See also

 Bah (Assembly constituency)
 Sixteenth Legislative Assembly of Uttar Pradesh
 Uttar Pradesh Legislative Assembly

References 

Samajwadi Party politicians
Bharatiya Janata Party politicians from Uttar Pradesh
Uttar Pradesh MLAs 1989–1991
Uttar Pradesh MLAs 1991–1993
Uttar Pradesh MLAs 1993–1996
Uttar Pradesh MLAs 1997–2002
Uttar Pradesh MLAs 2002–2007
Uttar Pradesh MLAs 2012–2017
People from Agra district
1953 births
Living people
Janata Dal politicians